Bay sach chruk is a Cambodian pork and rice dish. It is commonly served as a breakfast dish.

Description 
Bay sach chruk is made from thin cuts of pork marinated in palm sugar, garlic, coconut milk, and fish sauce - variations of the marinade used exist in different parts of Cambodia. This pork is served with a healthy side of rice paired with a bowl of chicken broth garnished with radishes and fried onions. The dish is normally prepared and kept warm over a grill or a bed of coals. It is a common breakfast food in Cambodia.

References 

Cambodian cuisine
Pork dishes